Neuwiedia is a genus of primitive terrestrial orchids (family Orchidaceae), comprising 9 species native to China, Southeast Asia and certain Pacific Islands.

The two genera in the subfamily Apostasioideae, Apostasia and Neuwiedia, differ from most other orchids in having three stamens. Recent studies suggest that the fifteen or so species in these two genera, although exhibiting "primitive" features, are "sister" genera rather than ancestors of other orchid families.
Like the genus Apostasia of the same subfamily, this genus is noted for having 3 fertile stamens instead of only two as in the case of other orchids. Because of this primitive characteristic, the genus was considered by some as not being true orchids.

The genus was named by Carl Ludwig von Blume in honor of Prince Maximilian of Wied-Neuwied (1782-1859).

The genus is distributed in shaded habitats. They are tall herbs with rhizomes and grow long, plicate leaves. They produce an unbranched, erect, terminal inflorescence bearing usually white or yellow, nodding flowers.

Species 
The following species are recognized as of June 2014:

 Neuwiedia borneensis de Vogel 1969  - Borneo
 Neuwiedia elongata de Vogel 1969  - Borneo
 Neuwiedia griffithii Rchb.f. 1874  - Vietnam, Malaya, Sumatra
 Neuwiedia inae de Vogel 1969  - Borneo, Vietnam
 Neuwiedia malipoensis Z.J.Liu, L.J.Chen & K.Wei Liu 2012 - Yunnan
 Neuwiedia siamensis de Vogel 1969  -Thailand
 Neuwiedia veratrifolia Blume 1834 - Indonesia, Malaysia, Philippines, New Guinea, Vanuatu, Solomon Islands
 Neuwiedia zollingeri Rchb.f. 1857 - Hainan, Hong Kong, Yunnan, Borneo, Sumatra, Java, Bali, Malaysia, Singapore, Thailand, Vietnam
 Neuwiedia zollingeri var. annamensis (Gagnep.) Aver - Vietnam
 Neuwiedia zollingeri var. javanica (J.J.Sm.) de Vogel - Vietnam, Borneo, Sumatra, Java, Bali
 Neuwiedia zollingeri var. singapureana (Wall. ex Baker) de Vogel - Hainan, Hong Kong, Yunnan, Thailand, Vietnam, Borneo, Sumatra, Malaysia
 Neuwiedia zollingeri var. zollingeri - Sumatra, Java

References 

  1993 -  Apostasiads, systematic anatomy, and the origins of Orchidaceae. Botanical Journal of the Linnean Society 111: 411–45
  - A phylogenetic analysis of Apostasioideae (Orchidaceae) based on ITS, trnL-F and matK sequences; Plant Syst. Evol. (2004)
  (1999): Genera Orchidacearum Vol.1, Oxford U. Press.

External links 

 
Orchid genera
Terrestrial orchids